The Guards Support Group was a brigade size formation within the British Guards Armoured Division. The Support Group (or "pivot group") provided whatever support the division's armoured brigades needed for the operation in hand. It was able to provide motorised infantry, field artillery, anti-tank artillery or light anti-aircraft artillery as needed. It was formed in 1941 by the conversion of the 7th Infantry Brigade (Guards) which had served in the Battle of France, and disbanded in 1942 (prior to seeing any active service) when it was converted into Headquarters, Royal Artillery, for Guards Armoured Division.

Commanders
The following officers commanded the support group during its existence:
15 September 1941 – 10 October 1941 Brigadier A. de L. Cazenove 
10 October 1941 – 31 May 1942 Brigadier L. C. Manners-Smith

Order of Battle
1st Battalion, Welsh Guards
153rd (Leicestershire Yeomanry) Field Regiment, Royal Artillery – from 10 October 1941 
21st Anti-Tank Regiment, Royal Artillery – from 10 October 1941 
94th Light Anti-Aircraft Regiment, Royal Artillery – from 27 January 1942

See also
 List of British brigades of the Second World War

Footnotes

References
Boscawen, Robert.  Armoured Guardsmen: A War Diary, June 1944 – April 1945. Barnsley, England: Pen & Sword, 2001.
 
Sanders, J, British Guards Armoured Division 1941-1945, Osprey Vanguard, 1979

Support groups of the British Army
Military units and formations established in 1941
Guards Division (United Kingdom)
Military units and formations disestablished in 1942